Geumjeongsan (or Geumjeong Mountain) is a mountain in the city of Busan in South Korea. It covers a large surface that extends into Dongnae-gu in the south, Buk-gu in the west, Geumjeong-gu in the east, and the city of Yangsan in the north. Its highest peak, Godang-bong, the highest peak in the region, stands at 801.5 meters on the city limit between Busan and Yangsan.

Geumjeongsan is the city's most popular hiking destination, and thousands of people climb it during the week-ends. The top can easily be reached using the cable-car in Geumgang Park near  Oncheonjang station or by taking the bus from Oncheonjang station to Saseongmaeul on the mountain top.

Sanseongmaeul (산성마을) is a small rural community built in the mountain valley, isolated from the surrounding city. It includes a few agricultural fields and livestock pastures on the valley sides. The place is well known for its speciality meal: "barbecued goat meat".

Geumjeongsan is renowned for the Geumjeongsanseong built on top of the mountain and Beomeo Temple on its north-east side.

Godangbong

Godangbong is the highest peak on the mountain. It stands at an altitude of 801.5 meters on the city limit between Busan and Yangsan. Its summit gives a great view of the surroundings, including Gimhae International Airport in Gangseo-gu. On very clear days it is possible to see the cities of Gimhae and Jinhae further to the south-west and the mountain relief of Tsushima Island half-way in the Korea Strait. It is home to a Gomodang, while Yonghoam Rock and Yongam Cave are located below the south. It takes about an hour and 20 minutes from Beomeosa Temple to GODANGbong Peak via the northern gate.

Geumsaem
Geumsaem (literally Golden fountain) is a naturally formed cavity on top of a granite boulder standing off a cliff about 500 meters east of Godang-bong.

According to the legend a golden fish (Geumeo, 그머) came down from the world of Brahma on a 5-coloured cloud and took residence in the golden fountain. The fountain is said to never dry and the colour of its water is always gold. The names of the mountain and Beomeo temple originated from that legend.

Today the legend is still represented in the symbols of Geumjeong-gu. The gu's logo represent the fountain and the gu's character is a cartoon representation of Geumeo.

See also
 List of mountains in Korea

References and external links

 On-site Stelae
 Geumjeong-gu  website
 Asian Historical Architecture: Geumjeongsan Fortress

Tourist attractions in Busan
Mountains of Busan
Geumjeong District
Mountains of South Gyeongsang Province
Yangsan
Tourist attractions in South Gyeongsang Province
Mountains of South Korea